The Dean of Clonmacnoise is based at The Cathedral Church of St Patrick, Trim in the united  Diocese of Meath and Kildare within the Church of Ireland.

The incumbent is Paul Bogle.

List of deans of Clonmacnoise

1561 William Flynn 
1579 Miler M'Clery 
1601 William Leicester 
1628 Marcus Lynch 
1629 Richard Price  
1633 Samuel Clarke 
1634 William Burley 
1661 John Kerdiffe  
1668–1681 Henry Cottingham (afterwards Archdeacon of Meath, 1681) 
1681 Theophilus Harrison 
16nn–1720 Stephen Handcock (deprived under James II, but restored 1697) 
1720–1741 Anthony Dopping (afterwards Bishop of Ossory, 1741) 
1742 John Owen  
1761 Arthur Champagne 
1800–1806 Charles Mongan Warburton (afterwards Bishop of Limerick, 1806) 
1806 Thomas Vesey Dawson  
1811->1842 Henry Roper  
1847–1862 Richard Butler 
1862–1882 John Brownlow 
1882–1885 Charles Parsons Reichel (afterwards Bishop of Meath, 1885) 
1885–1892 Francis Swifte 
1892–1900 Richard Dowse
1900–1904 Graham Craig  
1904–1912 Richard Stuart Dobbs Campbell
1923-1930 Richard Stewart Craig

1958-1961 Robert Charters
1961-1979 Thomas Victor Perry
1979-1989 Thomas Andrew Noble Bredin
1989-1996 John Alan Gardiner Barrett
1997–2002 Andrew William Ussher Furlong
2002–2012 Robert William Jones
2013–present Paul Bogle

References

 
Diocese of Meath and Kildare
Clonmacnoise